Conocotocko of Chota  ("Standing Turkey"), known in English as Old Hop, was a Cherokee elder, serving as the First Beloved Man of the Cherokee from 1753 until his death in 1760.  Settlers of European ancestry referred to him as Old Hop.

Old Hop was the uncle of Attakullakulla, better known as Little Carpenter.

Anthropologist and Native American historian Fred Gearing described Old Hop's career:

See also
 Transylvania (colony)
 Attakullakulla

References

Notes

Citations

Bibliography
 
 
 
 

1760 deaths
18th-century Cherokee people
18th-century Native Americans
Native American leaders
People of pre-statehood Tennessee
Year of birth unknown
People from Chota (Cherokee town)
Native American people from Tennessee

ca:Stalking Turkey